Saffranspannkaka or Gotlandspannkaka (English: saffron pancake or Gotland pancake, Gutnish: saffranspannkake or saffranspannkakå) is a dessert from the island of Gotland, Sweden, and is considered as one of their provincial dishes. It is made of pudding rice, cream, milk, sugar, egg, chopped almonds, and saffron. The cake can be eaten lukewarm or cold and is served according to tradition with dewberry jam and whipped cream. If necessary, with regard to allergies, the almonds can be excluded.

History 
The concept of saffron pancake have it roots back to the Middle Ages and renaissance when flavored and coloured rice puddings occurred in the higher class environment. And as Gotland was part of the Hansa they did not only have access to exotic spices, but they were also rich enough to enjoy them. The particular combination of rice-almond-saffron-sugar made the dish very exclusive, compared to the saffron bread which have been known since the 16th century.

Oven pancakes was mostly only served during feasts and they have been known on Gotland since the 18th century. They are turned into feast food with the addition of fine flour and eggs. During the 19th century it did not only became common with sugar in the pancakes, but also saffron and raisins. Today's saffranspannkaka, that is made with pudding rice which is then baked in an oven, belongs to the pudding deserts that were common during the 19th century when the wooden stove made cooking easier.

Saffranspannkaka have certain connotations with Christmas as it is sometimes made with the leftover Christmas pudding, but during the 19th and 20th century it have also been served at anniversaries, weddings, and funerals. The jam that is eaten together with the pancake is also a fashion from the 19th century when sugar became cheaper and sweet jams became a most popular addition to these desserts. It is today unknown if the saffranspannkaka was created on Gotland, or if someone brought it to the island.
During the latter half of the 20th century the saffranspannkaka have become a well-known tourism symbol for Gotland and is often served at summer-open tourism restaurants and in other contexts where the local island food is highlighted. It have also been appointed as Gotland's provincial dish.

References 

Swedish desserts
Pancakes
Rice dishes
Saffron